Liberty is a small populated place in Maricopa County, Arizona, United States. It is located about 30 miles (50 kilometers) west of Phoenix and about 6 miles (10 kilometers) southeast of Buckeye. Liberty is located at the intersection of South Jackrabbit Trail and West Baseline Road. It is located entirely within Block 3017, Block Group 3, Census Tract 506.01, Maricopa County, Arizona, which had a population of 63 at the 2000 census.

The original settlers named the location Altamount, the settlement soon became called Toothaker Place, after the first postmaster, Harriet Toothaker, who ran the post office out of her home.  When the post office was relocated in 1901, it was renamed Liberty, and with it the community.

Liberty is home to the Liberty Elementary School District headquarters, although the district itself has expanded out to include much of the surrounding areas of Buckeye and Goodyear.

Liberty exists as a county island within the corporate boundaries of Buckeye.  This precludes any possibility of incorporation for the community.

Notable person
 John C. Butler – Awarded the Navy Cross for his actions in the Battle of Midway during World War II.

Images of Liberty

Images of the historic structures in Liberty

Historic Liberty Cemetery
According to the definition by the "Pioneers' Cemetery Association (PCA)" a "historic cemetery" is one which has been in existence for more than fifty years.

References

Unincorporated communities in Maricopa County, Arizona
Unincorporated communities in Arizona